The Smallest Books in the World is a Latin American publishing house created in Peru by Alberto Briceño in 1970. Specialized in the handmade confection of mini books with dimensions of one square centimeter to the standardization of 5 x 6 x 2 centimeters. Initially it produced 120-page mini-books and currently has 480 pages

Gallery

References

Book publishing companies
Publishing companies of Peru
Publishing companies established in 1970